Edward Culliatt Jones (July 21, 1822 – February 12, 1902) was an American architect from Charleston, South Carolina.  A number of his works are listed on the U.S. National Register of Historic Places, and two are further designated as U.S. National Historic Landmarks.  His works include the following (with the first eight being NRHP-listed works):

Farmers' and Exchange Bank (designed 1853, completed 1854), 141 East Bay St., Charleston, South Carolina, a National Historic Landmark
Magnolia Cemetery (1850), 70 Cunnington Ave., Charleston, South Carolina
Old Colleton County Jail, Jeffries Blvd., Walterboro, South Carolina
Orangeburg County Jail, 44 Saint John St., Orangeburg, South Carolina (with Francis D. Lee)
South Carolina National Bank of Charleston, 16 Broad St., Charleston, South Carolina
St. Mark's Church, W of Pinewood on SR 51, Pinewood, South Carolina
Walker Hall, SE of Spartanburg on SC 56, Spartanburg, South Carolina
Wofford College Historic District, Wofford College campus, Spartanburg, South Carolina
Trinity Methodist Church (1848), 273 Meeting St., Charleston, South Carolina
Vigilant Fire Engine House, State St., Charleston, South Carolina
Moultrie House (1850), a hotel on Sullivan's Island, South Carolina (no longer standing)
Camden Depot (1850), a train depot at 23 Ann St., Charleston, South Carolina
Roper Hospital (1849), Queen St., Charleston, South Carolina (no longer standing)
Col. John A.S. Ashe House (1853), 26 South Battery, Charleston, South Carolina
New Work House (a colored prison), southwest corner of Magazine and Logan Sts. (no longer standing)
Church of the Holy Cross (1850), Stateburg, South Carolina, National Historic Landmark
Marlboro County Courthouse (1850), Bennettsville, South Carolina (rehabilitated 1981)
Palmetto Fire Co. (1850), 27 Anson St., Charleston, South Carolina
252 King Street (1851), Charleston, South Carolina (no longer standing)
Aiken House (1851), a hotel in Aiken, South Carolina (no longer standing)
Shell Hall Hotel, Mt. Pleasant, South Carolina (no longer standing)
Bank of Augusta (1852), Augusta, Georgia
Zion Presbyterian Church, Calhoun St., Charleston, South Carolina (no longer standing)
Flat Rock (Farmers') Hotel, Flat Rock, North Carolina
St. John in the Wilderness Church, Flat Rock, North Carolina
Calvary Church, Fletcher, North Carolina
Normal School of Charleston, Charleston, South Carolina (no longer standing)
Friend Street Public School (1859), Legare and Broad Sts., Charleston, South Carolina (destroyed by fire, 1861)
German Fire Company Engine House (1851), 8 Chalmers St., Charleston, South Carolina (rehabilitated, 1981)

References

Further reading

 .

 

 

 .

External links

1822 births
1902 deaths
Architects from South Carolina
Artists from Charleston, South Carolina
19th-century American architects
Architects from Tennessee
People from Memphis, Tennessee